The 2021–22 Egyptian Handball League was the 66th edition of the Egyptian Handball League In this edition, 18 teams compete in three stages, headed by the holder of the last three editions of Zamalek.

League system

The handball league system this season is divided into 3 phases:
•The first stage:
In it, 18 teams will participate in a league of one round, each team plays 17 matches, and the results of those born in 2002/2004 will be added to it.
The teams are arranged after adding the legal points, where the first league 2002/2004 takes 9 points, the second 8.5 points, the third 8 points, and so on, then they are added to the original points of the men's squad and the teams are arranged on this basis.
•The second phase:
Teams are divided into three groups
The first group includes the first 6 teams from the 18 teams in the first stage, the second group includes the individual ranking holders from the seventh to the 17th
A third group includes the owners of the doubles ranking from the eighth to the 18th
After the end of the stage, legal points will be added, the first takes 3 points, the second takes 2.5 points, and so on The third and final stage: It includes the first 4 teams, legal points will be added, the 1st takes 2 points, the 2nd takes 1.5 points, and The 3rd takes 1 points and the 4th takes 0.5 points and they play two combined rounds to determine the league champion, meaning that each team will play 6 matches in this stage.

The first stage

Team 2002
Note The first team in the ranking gets 9 points, the second 8.5, the third 8, and so on until the last team gets 0.5 points.
last update 10-11-2021

Team 2004
Note The first team in the ranking gets 9 points, the second 8.5, the third 8, and so on until the last team gets 0.5 points.
Final Group(2004)

First Team

Group

Results

The Second stage

First Team

Group A

Results

Group B

Group C

The Final Stage

Results

Resources

Handball in Egypt